Železno is a small settlement in the Municipality of Žalec in east-central Slovenia. It lies on the southwestern edge of the Hudinja Hills north of Žalec. The area is part of the traditional region of Styria. The municipality is now included in the Savinja Statistical Region.

References

External links
Železno at Geopedia

Populated places in the Municipality of Žalec